The chair in Medieval and Renaissance English is a professorship in English literature at Cambridge University. It was created in 1954 for C. S. Lewis, and is unusual among professorships in this field in uniting 'medieval' and 'renaissance' categories and fields of study.

Professors of Medieval and Renaissance English
 C. S. Lewis, 1954
 J. A. W. Bennett, 1964
 John Stevens, 1978
 Jill Mann, 1988
 James Simpson, 1999
 Helen Cooper, 2005
 Nicolette Zeeman, 2016

References

Professorships at the University of Cambridge
School of Arts and Humanities, University of Cambridge
Professorships in literature
1954 establishments in England